Kentucky Route 383 (KY 383) is a  state highway in the U.S. state of Kentucky. The highway connects mostly rural areas of Simpson County with Franklin.

Route description
KY 383 begins at the Tennessee state line in the southwestern part of Simpson County, where the roadway continues as Tennessee State Route 49. It travels to the north-northeast and crosses over the Red River. It curves to the northeast and has an intersection with the eastern terminus of KY 591 (Adairville Road). It then curves to the east-northeast and travels through Providence. It curves back to the northeast and temporarily parallels Neely Branch before curving to the east-northeast and crossing over the branch. It curves to the north-northeast and intersects the eastern terminus of KY 664 (Sulphur Springs Church Road). The highway heads to the east and intersects the northern terminus of KY 816 (Schweizer Road). It travels to the northeast and enters Franklin. After intersecting KY 1008 (McLendon Road / Bluegrass Road), it travels just to the west of Franklin–Simpson High School. It curves to the east-southeast and meets its northern terminus, an intersection with U.S. Route 31W (South Main Street). Here, the roadway continues as East Madison Street.

Major intersections

See also

References

0383
Transportation in Simpson County, Kentucky